Flori Luiz Binotti (born 17 April 1963) is a Brazilian politician, businessman and the former Mayor of Lucas do Rio Verde, Brazil, having succeeded Otaviano Pivetta on 1 January 2017. Binotti is a member of the Social Democratic Party (PSD).

He was succeeded by Miguel Vaz, Otaviano Pivetta’s former vice-mayor.

External links
Novo Tempo Empreendimentos

References 

1963 births
Living people
Brazilian people of Italian descent
Brazilian businesspeople